Haliplus mucronatus is a species of Haliplidae in the genus Haliplus. It was discovered by Stephens in 1828.

References

Haliplidae
Beetles described in 1828